Sergius was the third Bulgarian Patriarch of the Bulgarian Orthodox Church.

References

Patriarchs of Bulgaria